Diamond of Istanbul is the tallest building under construction in Istanbul, Turkey, being built on the Büyükdere Avenue in the city's Maslak central business district of Sarıyer. It is also the country's first steel skyscraper. When completed, it will rise 63 floors above ground level and reach an above-ground height of 311 meters; thus surpassing the current tallest skyscraper in Istanbul, the 302m (60 floors) Istanbul Sapphire in Levent.

Its design, by Dome Architecture of Istanbul, comprises three steel wings connected to the central (concrete) elevator core. The three wings (towers) will house a luxury hotel (the tallest tower), A-class offices (the second-tallest tower), and rental skyscraper apartments (the shortest tower.) The tallest of the three wings (the hotel tower) will have an overall total of 63 floors above ground (three retail facility floors, 48 hotel tower floors and two panoramic restaurant floors above the hotel floors, at heights of 249.10m and 263.10m, respectively), and reach an overall structural height of 311m from street level. The steel wings rise from the common podium of a shopping mall comprising five floors - three above-ground and two below. The complex also has a five-floor parking garage situated in the bottom-most basement floors of the building (with a total of eight basement floors below ground level.)

The panoramic restaurant on the top-most floor will be at one of the tallest man-made points in Istanbul and Turkey.

Construction work 
The construction of the project began in February 2002 with the start of demolition of an old nine-floor office building on the plot. The tower's steel beams began assembly in 2006.

The total area of the construction site comprises around 14,000 m².

Due to the space limitations around the construction site - the site is situated on one of the busiest transport arteries of Istanbul, Buyukdere Avenue - and to minimize the impact of construction activities on the traffic, all concrete pouring activities using concrete mixer trucks are performed at night.

As of April 2012, the project is on hold.

The companies involved in the development and construction of the project are:
 Hattat Holding – investor company, Istanbul, company web site,
 Dome Architecture – the project's architectural design, Istanbul, company web site,
 Hattat İnşaat – construction subsidiary of Hattat Holding and the project's main construction company, Istanbul, 
 MG İnşaat – construction roughworks subcontractor of the project, Istanbul,
 Burak Hafriyat – foundation excavation of the project, Istanbul, company web site,
 Thornton-Tomasetti Engineers – the structural design of the tower's steel wings, New Jersey, U.S., company web site,
 Tuncel Mühendislik – project's static design, Istanbul, company web site,
 Arcelor Commercial Sections S.A. – production of the steel columns and beams of the project's steel wings, Luxembourg, company web site, 
 Tabosan – final processing of the Arcelor-produced steel columns and beams and their on-site installation, Istanbul, company web site,
 Samko – specialized consultant for the on-site assembly of the steel columns and beams, Istanbul, company web site,
 Tanrıöver Mühendislik – mechanical  engineering, Istanbul, company web site, 
 OYAK Beton and Nuh Beton – companies providing ready-mix concrete to the construction site.

References 
Emporis Buildings Database - Diamond of Istanbul

See also 
 Istanbul
List of tallest buildings in Istanbul

Buildings and structures in Istanbul
Skyscrapers in Istanbul
Residential skyscrapers in Istanbul
Sarıyer
Skyscraper office buildings in Turkey
Skyscraper hotels